The Instrument in Support of Trade Exchanges (INSTEX) is a European special-purpose vehicle (SPV) established on 31 January 2019. Its mission is to facilitate non-USD and non-SWIFT transactions with Iran to avoid breaking U.S. sanctions.

Five EU nations declared in a joint statement on 29 November 2019 that they will join the INSTEX mechanism for trade with Iran. These countries are Belgium, Denmark, Netherlands, Finland and Sweden.

European countries said on March 2023 they had decided to end INSTEX, through which only a single transaction had traded.  Ali Khamenei, Leader of the Islamic Revolution, likened the European financial mechanism for trade with Iran to a “bitter joke".

HQ
The SPV is headquartered in Paris and is headed by Per Fischer, who formerly served as Head of Financial Institutions at Commerzbank, between 2003 and 2014.

Purpose
As of May 2019, the use of the SPV is limited to humanitarian purposes; such as the purchase of foods or medicines. INSTEX had been made available to all EU member states. On 11 February 2019, Russian deputy foreign minister Sergei Ryabkov stated that Russia would be interested in participating in INSTEX.

Operations
On 28 June 2019, France, Germany and the United Kingdom told a meeting of the JCPOA Joint Commission that INSTEX had been made operational and available to all EU member states. Federica Mogherini, High Representative of the European Union for Foreign Affairs and Security Policy stated that the purpose of INSTEX is to facilitate "legitimate trade" with Iran for any EU member and has been conceived to be open to non-EU countries.

In Iran, INSTEX is mirrored by the STFI (Special Trade and Finance Instrument), a similar SPV. STFI matches incoming and outgoing transactions in the same way. In effect, two Iranian entities pay each other, thus, no money crosses the Iranian border.

On 31 March 2020, over one year after the introduction of the platform, the first INSTEX transaction was concluded. It covered an import of medical equipment to combat the COVID-19 outbreak in Iran.

Geo-economic effects 
As academic Tim Beal summarizes, INSTEX is among the responses to sanctions imposed by the United States viewed by commentators as contributing to dedollarization.

See also
Central Bank of Iran
Iran–European Union relations
Sanctions against Iran
Sanctions against Russia
Sanctions against Belarus

References

Financial services companies established in 2019
Companies based in Paris
International organizations based in France
Presidency of Hassan Rouhani